Black Carl was an American funk rock band from Phoenix, Arizona. The band is made up of lead vocalist Emma Pew, drummer John Krause, guitarist Chad Leonard, guitarist Matt Noakes, and bassist Ian Woodward.

History

Black Carl's name originated from drummer John Krause's roommate. "I was recording stuff and let my roommate hear the first song. He laughed and said, 'This is the Pink Floyd of hip hop. You should call it Black Carl.'" 

They use elements of funk, soul, blues, and rock to create a sound that, according to the band, "will make you feel like you're riding a psychotic horse toward a burning stable."

In January 2008, they released an EP titled Black Carl. The EP reached #1 on The Blaze, ASU's college radio station for the week of 3/31/08. Later, members of the band appeared as guest DJs on the station, appearing after Jim Adkins of Jimmy Eat World. The EP features a cover of the Shel Talmy-penned "Bald Headed Woman," staple in their set. The band has been known to cover "Psycho Killer" by the Talking Heads.

Present 
On October 9, 2021, the band performed a reunion show at Crescent Ballroom with Fairy Bones, Wyves, and Adam Bruce (of Mergence).

Band Members 

 Emma Pew - vocals
 John Krause - drums
 Chad Leonard - guitar
 Matt Noakes - guitar
 Ian Woodward - bass

Discography

Albums 

The Wheel (2013)
Borrowed (2009)

EPs 

Black Carl (2008)

7" Singles

The Magician/The Hanged Man (2011)
The Fool (2011)
The Chariot (2010)

References

External links
 Official MySpace Page
Black Carl Website

Rock music groups from Arizona
Musical groups from Tempe, Arizona